The Azania Front Lutheran Church is a Lutheran church in Dar es Salaam, Tanzania, serving as a cathedral for the local diocese. It is among the most well-known landmarks and tourist attractions of the city. It is in the city center, close to the ocean, facing the harbour. It was built by the German missionaries in 1898, in the Bavarian style of the time, with a red-tiled roof, tiled canopies over the windows and bright white walls.

Notes

Churches in Tanzania
Buildings and structures in Dar es Salaam
Churches completed in 1898
19th-century Lutheran churches
Tourist attractions in Dar es Salaam
1898 establishments in the German colonial empire